CLEAN may refer to: 

 Component Validator for Environmentally Friendly Aero Engine
 CLEAN (algorithm), a computational algorithm used in astronomy to perform a deconvolution on dirty images
 Commonwealth Law Enforcement Assistance Network, a system used by law enforcement and other criminal justice agencies in Pennsylvania which interfaces NCIC, Penndot and other sources beneficial to law enforcement personnel. Operated by the Pennsylvania State Police.
 Cryogenic Low-Energy Astrophysics with Noble gases, a liquid argon dark matter detector under construction at SNOLAB.